The 1967 NCAA University Division Wrestling Championships were the 37th NCAA University Division Wrestling Championships to be held. Kent State University in Kent, Ohio hosted the tournament at Memorial Gym.

Michigan State took home the team championship with 74 points and having two individual champions.

Rick Sanders of Portland State was named the Most Outstanding Wrestler and Curley Culp of Arizona State received the Gorriaran Award.

Team results

Individual finals

References

NCAA Division I Wrestling Championship
NCAA
Wrestling competitions in the United States
NCAA University Division Wrestling Championships
NCAA University Division Wrestling Championships
NCAA University Division Wrestling Championships